Hybos femoratus is a species of fly in the family Hybotidae. It is found in the  Palearctic .

References

External links
Images representing Hybos femoratus at BOLD

Hybotidae
Insects described in 1776
Asilomorph flies of Europe
Taxa named by Otto Friedrich Müller